Zhang Dan (born 16 January 1982) is a Chinese badminton player and in 2008 she started representing Macau.

Career 
Zhang was specialized in women's doubles and mixed doubles, earning numerous international titles in both events.

At the 2005 World Championships tournament she took a bronze in women's doubles with Zhang Yawen.
At the 2007 Summer Universiade she took a silver medal with the Chinese mixed team and two individual bronze medals in women's doubles with Wang Lin and in mixed doubles with Chen Hong.

She reached nine finals at Grand Prix events in women's doubles between 2003 and 2006, winning three events with Zhang Yawen, the 2004 Thailand Open & German Open and the 2005 Singapore Open.

In 2007, she became the women's doubles semifinalist of the Korea International Challenge tournament partnered with Zhang Zhibo.

In 2008, she became the women's doubles runner-up of the China Masters tournament partnered with Zhang Zhibo. They were defeated by Cheng Shu and Zhao Yunlei of China in straight games 14–21, 11–21.

In 2009, she and partner Zhang Zhibo won the gold medal for Macau at the East Asian Games in the women's doubles event after they beat the top seeds from China, Ma Jin and Wang Xiaoli with the score 22–20, 21–16. She also became the women's doubles semifinalist of the Macau and Denmark Open tournaments. At Macau, she and her partner Zhang Zhibo were defeated by the 2008 Olympic Games gold medalist Du Jing and Yu Yang with the score 10–21, 17–21; and at Denmark, they were defeated by Pan Pan and Zhang Yawen of China.

In 2010, she qualified to represent Macau at the Asian Games. However, in accordance with the competition rules, players must be three years after they last competed for their country of origin before they will be able to represent the country, so her entry qualification was canceled; the Macau team also decided to withdraw from the competition. Not long after Zhang Dan retired from playing on international level.

Achievements

BWF World Championships 
Women's doubles

World Cup 
Women's doubles

Summer Universiade 
Women's doubles

Mixed doubles

East Asian Games 

Women's doubles

BWF Superseries 
The BWF Superseries, launched on 14 December 2006 and implemented in 2007, is a series of elite badminton tournaments, sanctioned by the Badminton World Federation (BWF). BWF Superseries has two level such as Superseries and Superseries Premier. A season of Superseries features twelve tournaments around the world, which introduced since 2011, with successful players invited to the Superseries Finals held at the year end.

Women's doubles

IBF Grand Prix 
The World Badminton Grand Prix has been sanctioned by the International Badminton Federation since 1983.

Women's doubles

References

External links 

 

1982 births
Living people
Badminton players from Liaoning
Chinese female badminton players
Macau female badminton players
Universiade medalists in badminton
Universiade silver medalists for China
Universiade bronze medalists for China
Badminton players at the 2010 Asian Games
Asian Games competitors for China
Medalists at the 2007 Summer Universiade